Nicolae Șerban (born 2 July 1967) is a Romanian biathlete. He competed in the men's 20 km individual event at the 1992 Winter Olympics.

References

1967 births
Living people
Romanian male biathletes
Olympic biathletes of Romania
Biathletes at the 1992 Winter Olympics
Place of birth missing (living people)